The 668th Bomb Squadron is an inactive United States Air Force unit. It was last assigned to the 416th Operations Group at Griffiss Air Force Base, New York, where it was inactivated on 1 January 1995.

The squadron was first activated as the 668th Bombardment Squadron, a medium bomber unit during World War II.  It trained in the United States before deploying to the European Theater of Operations, where it served with Ninth Air Force.  It moved to the continent of Europe following D-Day and continued operations until the end of the war, earning a Distinguished Unit Citation for its actions in combat.  It returned to the United States in the fall of 1945 and was inactivated at the port of embarkation.

The squadron was organized again under Strategic Air Command in 1963 and maintained its aircraft on nuclear alert until the end of the Cold War.  Although the squadron itself did not see combat, it deployed aircrews and bombers to augment other forces during the Vietnam War and Desert Storm.

History

World War II

The squadron was first activated at Will Rogers Field, Oklahoma as the 668th Bombardment Squadron, one of the four original squadrons of the 416th Bombardment Group.  Although designated as a light bomber unit, in June 1943 it moved to Lake Charles Army Air Field, Louisiana, where it was an Operational Training Unit for North American B-25 Mitchell medium bomber units.  In September, the squadron equipped with Douglas A-20 Havoc light bombers and began to train with them for deployment the European Theater of Operations.  The squadron departed the United States at the beginning of January 1944.

The squadron arrived at RAF Wethersfield, England, its first European station, in February 1944.  Although its parent 416th Group was the first A-20 unit to be assigned to Ninth Air Force, its aircraft were transported by ship and lagged behind the ground and air echelons of the squadron.  However, It was able to fly its first combat mission, a diversionary mission for heavy bombers flying in Operation Pointblank on 3 March.  Initially most of its missions were flown against V-1 flying bomb and V-2 rocket launch sites in France.  It flew a number of missions against airfields and coastal defenses to help prepare for Operation Overlord, the invasion of Normandy.  The unit supported the invasion in June 1944 by striking road junctions, marshalling yards, bridges, and railway overpasses.

The 668th assisted ground forces at Caen and supported Operation Cobra, the breakout at St Lo in July.  Later in the summer it supported operations near Brest by hitting transportation facilities, supply dumps and radar installations. In spite of intense resistance, the squadron bombed bridges, (including one of the last bridges across the Seine at Oissel) railways, rolling stock and a radar station to disrupt the enemy's retreat through the Falaise Gap between 6 and 9 August, for which it was awarded a Distinguished Unit Citation. In September, the squadron provided support for Operation Market Garden, the airborne attack attempting to establish a bridgehead over the Rhine in the Netherlands. Later that month, it moved to Melun Airfield, France to reduce response times for ground support of the advancing Allied forces.  It supported the assault on the Siegfried Line by with attacks on transportation, warehouses, supply dumps and defended villages in Germany.

At Melun, the squadron became part of the first group in IX Bomber Command to convert to the Douglas A-26 Invader.  It was taken off operations on 6 November, and flew its first mission with the new plane on 17 November, attacking a depot at Haguenau.  Because all Invaders delivered to the unit were solid nosed versions, it retained a few A-20s to lead boxes in formation bombing.  It would not be until a mission on 8 February 1945 that the squadron would have sufficient glass nosed A-26s on hand to retire its A-20s from combat. During the Battle of the Bulge the following month, it used its new bomber to attack transportation facilities, strong points, communications centers and troop concentrations.  This support lasted until January 1945. The squadron also aided the Allied advance into Germany by continuing its strikes against transportation, communications, airfields and storage depots. It bombed flak positions in support of Operation Varsity, the airborne assault across the Rhine, in March 1945 and continued operations until 3 May, when it flew its last mission of the war.  The unit remained in Europe after V-E Day until September 1945, when it returned to the United States for inactivation at the port of embarkation on 11 October 1945.

Strategic Air Command
In 1962, in order to perpetuate the lineage of many currently inactive bombardment units with illustrious World War II records, Strategic Air Command (SAC) received authority from Headquarters USAF to discontinue its Major Command controlled strategic wings that were equipped with combat aircraft and to activate Air Force controlled units, which could carry a lineage and history.  As a result, the 416th Bombardment Wing replaced the 4039th Strategic Wing at Griffiss Air Force Base, New York.  The changes to the wing meant that the squadron was organized in February 1963, and took over the mission, personnel and equipment of the 75th Bombardment Squadron, which was simultaneously inactivated. 

One half of the squadron's Boeing B-52G Stratofortress aircraft were maintained on fifteen minute alert, fully fueled and ready for combat to reduce vulnerability to a Soviet missile strike.  The squadron continued the mission of strategic bombardment training to meet SAC commitments.  In June 1968, squadron aircrews began deploying to support Operation Arc Light and Linebacker missions in Southeast Asia.  These deployments continued until 1975.

The squadron began preparing for a conventional warfare role in 1988, although it maintained B-52s on nuclear alert until September 1991. the squadron  deployed crews and aircraft to Prince Abdullah Air Base, Saudi Arabia, during Operation Desert Shield from August 1990, then deployed B-52s to Moron Air Base, Spain; RAF Fairford, England; and Naval Support Facility Diego Garcia, from which they flew combat missions during Operation Desert Storm from January until April 1991.  The squadron was inactivated in 1995 as Griffiss closed following the recommendation of the 1993 Base Realignment and Closure Commission.

Lineage
 Constituted as the 668th Bombardment Squadron (Light) on 25 January 1943
 Redesignated 668th Bombardment Squadron, Light on 20 August 1943
 Activated on 5 February 1943
 Inactivated on 11 October 1945
 Redesignated the 668th Bombardment Squadron (Heavy) and activated on 15 November 1962 (not organized)
 Organized on 1 February 1963
 Redesignated 668th Bomb Squadron on 1 September 1991
 Inactivated on 1 January 1995

Assignments
 416th Bombardment Group, 5 February 1943 – 11 October 1945
 Strategic Air Command, 15 November 1962 (not organized)
 416th Bombardment Wing, 1 February 1963
 416th Operations Group, 1 September 1991 – 1 January 1995

Stations
 Will Rogers Field, Oklahoma, 5 February 1943
 Lake Charles Army Air Field, Louisiana, 4 June 1943
 Laurel Army Air Field, Mississippi, 1 November 1943 – 1 January 1944
 RAF Wethersfield (AAF-170), England, 2 February 1944
 Melun Airfield (A-55), France, 25 September 1944
 Laon/Athies Airfield (A-69), France, 10 February 1945
 Cormeilles en Vexin Airfield (A-59), France, c. 25 May 1945
 Laon/Athies Airfield (A-69), France, 27 July–13 September 1945
 Camp Myles Standish, Massachusetts, 10–11 October 1945
 Griffiss Air Force Base, New York, 1 February 1963 – 1 January 1995

Aircraft
 North American B-25 Mitchell, 1943
 Douglas A-20 Havoc, 1943–1944
 Douglas A-26 Invader, 1944–1945
 Boeing B-52G Stratofortress, 1963–1991
 Boeing B-52H Stratofortress, 1991–1995

Awards and campaigns

See also
 List of B-52 Units of the United States Air Force
 List of A-26 Invader operators
 List of Douglas A-20 Havoc operators

References

Notes
 Explanatory notes

 Citations

Bibliography

External links

Bombardment squadrons of the United States Air Force
Units and formations of Strategic Air Command
Military units and formations of the United States in the Cold War